Yeo Jia Min (born 1 February 1999) is a Singaporean badminton player. She is a former World Junior No.1 and the first Singaporean in either the junior or senior categories to made it to the top of the BWF's ranking system.

Early life 
Yeo was born in Singapore to Malaysian Chinese emigrants who moved to Singapore and became permanent residents. Along with her parents, she became a Singaporean citizen sometime in her childhood. Yeo started playing badminton when she was seven years old, often playing with her parents. She then started formal training under the tutelage of former national player Tan Eng Han at the Assumption English School in Bukit Panjang. 
 
At nine, she competed in the 2008 Cheers Age Group Badminton Championships and won the Under-11 championship title. At age 10, she won the Under-11 singles title at an international level when she represented Singapore at the 2009 Li-Ning Youth International. In June 2012, with the intention of turning professional, she transferred from Nanyang Girls' High School in Bukit Timah to the sports-focused Singapore Sports School in Woodlands.

Career

2012–2014: Junior and senior circuits tryout 
In 2012, Yeo participated in three junior championships, the Badminton Asia Youth U17 & U15 Championships, the World Junior Mixed Team Championships and the World Junior Championships Eye-Level Cups. She played in both the singles and doubles disciplines, with her best showing at the Badminton Asia Youth Under-15 girl's singles championships where she reached the quarter-finals.

In 2013, at age 14, Yeo played in her first senior tournament at the Singapore Open where she lost in the women's singles qualifying round to her compatriot Liang Xiaoyu in two games, 17–21, 11–21. In the women's doubles event, she partnered with Elaine Chua Yi Ling and lost in the first round to the Korean pairing of Chang Ye-na and Kim So-yeong, 20–22, 11–21. Later that year, she contested in the Badminton Asia Youth U17 & U15 Championships and emerged triumphant in the Under-15 girls' singles event.

In 2014, she competed in various senior and junior tournaments in multiple disciplines. Her best result came in the girl's singles event at the German Junior Open, where she lost in the semi-finals to then China's Qin Jinjing, 16–21, 18–21 in 33 minutes.

2015–2017: First senior title and World Junior #1  
In 2015, Yeo once again reached the semi-finals of the girl's singles event at the German Junior Open, but she lost to Denmark's Mia Blichfeldt. In June, she participated in her first Southeast Asian Games and managed to win bronze in the women's team event. In August, she finished as runner-up to Indonesia's Gregoria Mariska Tunjung at the Singapore International Series whom she lost to with a scoreline of 20–22, 15–21. In October, Yeo clinched two titles at the Badminton Asia U17 & U15 Junior Championships in Kudus, Indonesia. She defeated unseeded Indonesian Sri Fatmawati 21–15, 21–13 in the Under-17 girls' singles final. Then, she partnered compatriot Crystal Wong Jia Ying to beat Japan's Natsu Saito and Rumi Yoshida 21–18, 21–18 to clinch the U-17 girls' doubles title.

In 2016, Yeo won the first senior title of her career when she defeated Ayumi Mine of Japan in the Vietnam Open Grand Prix in two straight games. She followed up her success with another title, at the junior level, in the Junior Grand Prix held in Jakarta, Indonesia. There, she defeated Kim Ga-eun of Korea in two tightly contested games, 21–19, 21–19, to win the final in 35 minutes.

In 2017, Yeo continued her good form in the junior tournaments by winning the Dutch Junior Open held in March by beating Pattarasuda Chaiwan of Thailand in two games. The following week, she reached the final of the German Junior Open but lost to Hirari Mizui of Japan. In June, Yeo was ranked World Junior No.1 in the girls' singles event after she overtook Malaysia's Goh Jin Wei, making it the first time that a Singaporean badminton player, in either junior or senior categories, made it to the top of the BWF's ranking system. In July, Yeo won a bronze medal at the Asian Junior Championships after reaching the semi-finals stage. However, she was defeated by Chaiwan this time, in a marathon three-set match that lasted for 63 minutes. In August, she won her second women's team bronze at the Southeast Asian Games where Singapore reached the semi-finals of the women's team competition but lost to Thailand, the eventual winner, 0–3.

2018–2020: Two World Tour titles  
In April of 2018, Yeo competed at her first Commonwealth Games held in Gold Coast, Queensland, Australia. In June, she participated in the Mongolia International Series and was knocked out at the semi-finals by Joy Xuan Deng of Hong Kong in two straight sets, 15–21, 13–21. The following week, Yeo reached the final of White Nights, an International Challenge tournament held in Gatchina, Russia. There she met Deng once again and lost to her in a thrilling three-set match, 7–21, 21–13, 17–21 in 51 minutes. In August, Yeo continued her good showing in Vietnam by winning her second Vietnam Open title in three years. She defeated China's Han Yue, 21–19, 21–19 in the final to seal the victory. This is also her first World Tour success after BWF rebranded the tournaments in 2018. In September, Yeo took part in the Hyderabad Open and reached the semi-finals but she lost to Deng again, her third defeat to the same opponent on the tour that year.

In 2019, Yeo played in her first All England Open and was eliminated in the first round by China's former Olympic champion, Li Xuerui in two close games, 19–21, 20–22. In August, she won her first title of the year by winning the Hyderabad Open. In the final, she defeated the talented An Se-young of Korea in three exhausting games, 12–21, 21–17, 21–19 in 73 minutes. In the same month at the BWF World Championships, Yeo created history by becoming the first female shuttler from Singapore to reach the quarter-finals after she defeated Vietnam's Vu Thi Trang 21–15, 14–21, 21–16, in the third round, in a grueling 72 minutes battle. Yeo, who also defeated World No. 1, Akane Yamaguchi in the second round of the tournament met the 2013 World Champion, Ratchanok Intanon of Thailand in the quarter-finals but ended up losing to her in two straight games, 17–21, 11–21, thus ending her campaign without a medal. At the year-end Southeast Asian Games held in Manila, Philippines, she won her third women's team bronze after Singapore reached the semi-finals of the women's team competition but lost to Indonesia, 1–3.

Due to the COVID-19 pandemic, the 2020 badminton season was shortened and Yeo participated in only five tournaments. Her best result was at the Badminton Asia Team Championships where Singapore women's team reached the quarter-finals of the competition.

2021: Olympian  
Yeo began the season on the Thailand leg of the world tour at the Yonex Thailand Open and the Toyota Thailand Open where she lost in the first round to Ratchanok Intanon and second round to An Se-young respectively. In June, she qualified for her first ever Olympic Games after placing 17th in BWF’s road to Tokyo rankings. In July, Yeo competed at the delayed 2020 Tokyo Olympics but did not make it to the knockout round, and the 22 years old Yeo became emotional and, cried to the local media for her apologies from her exit in the games. In her first group stage game, she defeated Haramara Gaitan of Mexico in two straight games 21–7, 21–10 but then lost to Kim Ga-eun of Korea 13–21, 14–21 in the next match, thus ending her Olympics conquest. After the Olympics, she played on the European leg of the world tour held in Denmark, France and Germany. In the Denmark Open, she was eliminated in the first round by China's He Bing Jiao 14–21, 17–21. In the French Open, she reached the quarter-finals but lost to An Se-young 11–21, 17–21. In the Hylo Open held in Germany, she managed to reach her first final of the year, but she was defeated by the fifth seed, Busanan Ongbamrungphan of Thailand, in two straight games, 10–21, 14–21. In November, Yeo participated in the Indonesia Masters and Indonesia Open held in Bali. She was knockout by her former junior rivals, Phittayaporn Chaiwan in the quarter-finals and Akane Yamaguchi in the second round respectively.

In December, Yeo became the first Singaporean to qualify and play in the season-ending BWF World Tour Finals. She made her debut by playing Akane Yamaguchi but lost 11–21, 14–21. She then had to retire in the next match against Busanan Ongbamrungphan when she was trailing 7–21, 9–15 due to a right knee injury. At the year end World Championships held in Huelva, Spain, Yeo, the 15th seed, was upset in the second round by the unseeded Kirsty Gilmour of Scotland in a three set battle that lasted for 53 minutes, 15–21, 21–8, 15–21.

2022: Commonwealth Games bronze medalists  
In January, Yeo withdrew from the India Open before she could play her quarter-finals match against Thailand's Supanida Katethong, initially reported as having a high fever. Upon her return to Singapore, she was found to be infected with the COVID-19 virus. In April, she returned to tour at the Korea Open and managed to see off South Korea's Sim Yu-jin in the first round, 21–10, 21–13 before losing to her compatriot An Se-young in the second round, 10–21, 10–21. The following week, Yeo had a better showing at the Korea Masters where she reached the quarter-finals but lost to China's Wang Zhi Yi in straight sets, 13–21, 13–21. At the Badminton Asia Championships held in Manila, Philippines, she was eliminated in the second round after losing to Japan's Sayaka Takahashi in a three sets battle that lasted 49 minutes. In May, Yeo participated in the 31st SEA Games and clinched a joint-bronze in the women's team event. In the singles event, she reached the quarter-finals before losing to Thailand’s Phittayaporn Chaiwan, 12–21, 16–21. In June, she competed at the Indonesia Masters, Indonesia Open and Malaysia Open but were eliminated in the first round of all three by Supanida Katethong, Tai Tzu-ying and An Se-young respectively.

In July, at the Singapore Open, she reached the second round before bowing out against Thailand's Pornpawee Chochuwong in three sets, 21–16, 15–21, 11–21. At the 22nd Commonwealth Games held in Birmingham, England, Yeo won a bronze medal as Singapore finished in third place at the mixed team event, having defeated England 3–0. A few days later, she won another bronze medal after defeating Scotland's Kirsty Gilmour, 21–14, 22–20 in the women's singles bronze medal match. In August, Yeo missed out the BWF World Championships after testing positive for Covid-19 again. However, she recovered in time to take part in the Japan Open where she would suffer another first round defeat at the hand of Supanida Katethong. In October, Yeo played in both the Denmark and French Open and did not perform well, losing in the first round to Japan's Aya Ohori and China's Chen Yu Fei respectively in straight sets. In November, at the Hylo Open, Yeo advanced past the first round after defeating Chinese Tapei's Pai Yu-po in three sets, 16–21, 21–15, 21–12. She, however, could not overcome Spain's Carolina Marin in her next matchup, losing in straight sets, 14–21, 17–21. Yeo concluded her 2022 season with yet another first round defeat at the Australia Open, her seventh of the year on tour, after losing to Pai Yu Po, 6–21, 12–21.

2023  
Yeo started her new season with first round defeats to Pornpawee Chochuwong in the Malaysia and India Open respectively in straight games. In the Indonesia Masters, she faced another first round defeat, losing a closely contested rubber game against Line Christophersen of Denmark by 20–22, 21–14, 20–22. In February, Yeo played in only one match during the Badminton Asia Mixed Team Championships, where Singapore did not make it to the knockout stage. She competed in the opening round and suffered a defeat to Kim Ga-eun from South Korea, with a score of 21–19, 16–21, 19–21.

Awards 
Yeo received the 2020 Meritorious Award from the Singapore National Olympic Committee.

Achievements

Commonwealth Games 
Women's singles

Asian Junior Championships 
Girls' singles

BWF World Tour (2 titles, 1 runner-up) 
The BWF World Tour, which was announced on 19 March 2017 and implemented in 2018, is a series of elite badminton tournaments, sanctioned by Badminton World Federation (BWF). The BWF World Tour is divided into six levels, namely World Tour Finals, Super 1000, Super 750, Super 500, Super 300 (part of the BWF World Tour), and the BWF Tour Super 100.

Women's singles

BWF Grand Prix (1 title) 
The BWF Grand Prix had two levels, the Grand Prix and Grand Prix Gold. It was a series of badminton tournaments sanctioned by the Badminton World Federation (BWF) and played between 2007 and 2017.

Women's singles

  BWF Grand Prix Gold tournament
  BWF Grand Prix tournament

BWF International Challenge/Series (2 runners-up) 
Women's singles

  BWF International Challenge tournament
  BWF International Series tournament

References

External links
 

1999 births
Living people
Singaporean female badminton players
Badminton players at the 2020 Summer Olympics
Olympic badminton players of Singapore
Badminton players at the 2018 Commonwealth Games
Badminton players at the 2022 Commonwealth Games
Commonwealth Games bronze medallists for Singapore
Commonwealth Games medallists in badminton
Competitors at the 2015 Southeast Asian Games
Competitors at the 2017 Southeast Asian Games
Competitors at the 2019 Southeast Asian Games
Competitors at the 2021 Southeast Asian Games
Southeast Asian Games bronze medalists for Singapore
Southeast Asian Games medalists in badminton
21st-century Singaporean women
Medallists at the 2022 Commonwealth Games